Loxsoma is a terrestrial fern genus endemic to New Zealand with a single species, Loxsoma cunninghamii.

In the original publication, the name was spelled Loxoma but subsequently it was spelled Loxsoma, and this is now the conserved spelling.

References

Cyatheales
Monotypic fern genera
Flora of New Zealand